Insect fighting is a range of competitive sporting activity, commonly associated with gambling, in which insects are pitted against each other.

Background 
Forms of insect fighting as spectator sport are practiced in regions of China, Japan, Vietnam, and Thailand. Some types have a long history; for example, cricket-fighting is a traditional Chinese pastime that dates back to the Tang Dynasty (618–907). Originally an indulgence of emperors, cricket fighting later became popular among commoners. Beetle-fighting, with such beetles as the Japanese rhinoceros beetle, Xylotrupes socrates, Dorcus titanus, Goliathus, and dynastinae beetles also occurs, especially in Japan. There is also an online fan community, watching those fights in videos on different platforms. A YouTube community also strives in creating content for insect-fighting.

In popular culture 
Japanese Bug-Fights (世界最強虫王決定戦) refers to a more than 58-part video series featuring various kinds of insects, arachnids, and other creatures battling to the death in a little plastic arena. Only two bugs participate in a fight at a time, and most fights end with one bug killing its opponent. In some cases, the fights end in a draw if neither bug is able to kill its opponent.

The Chinese Cricket Championships is an annual cricket-fighting competition held in Beijing. It lasts for two days and usually takes place during autumn, when crickets are said to be at their prime age. Significant investment is put into making sure the crickets can perform at their best. It is said that the crickets are given a diet of bean paste and water to help with their training. Crickets are divided into weight classes, much like how human fighters are divided in boxing and mixed martial arts.

Betting 
At many insect fights, gamblers stake money on an insect. Betting on insect fighting is illegal in many places and has occasionally led to arrests and casualties.

In November 2018, the New York Post reported that an illegal cricket fighting ring was discovered in a casino featuring bets that went up to 140,000 dollars; two arrests were made.

In the Philippines, there have been reported fights that have caused casualties due to disputes over betting from spider fights. In one incident, a 15-year-old fatally stabbed a 13-year-old over an unpaid debt that amounted to 10 cents. In another incident, one man was killed and another injured when shots were fired after a dispute over the winnings.

See also 
Spider fighting
Monster Bug Wars

References 

Baiting (blood sport)
Insect-related occupations or hobbies